The women's singles competition of the 2019 World Table Tennis Championships was held from 23 to 27 April 2019. Ding Ning was the defending champion but lost in the semifinals.

Liu Shiwen won the title after defeating Chen Meng 9–11, 11–7, 11–7, 7–11, 11–0, 11–9. Later in a sit down interview with CCTV, Liu stated that she expected Chen to take an early lead since she had a technical advantage, but Liu felt she had a psychological advantage due to her two finals experiences and extreme desire to win.

Seeds

  Ding Ning (semifinals)
  Chen Meng (final)
  Wang Manyu (semifinals)
  Liu Shiwen (champion)
  Kasumi Ishikawa (fourth round)
  Mima Ito (third round)
  Cheng I-ching (third round)
  Miu Hirano (quarterfinals)
  Feng Tianwei (fourth round)
  Suh Hyowon (fourth round)
  Doo Hoi Kem (quarterfinals)
  Hitomi Sato (fourth round)
  Kim Song-i (fourth round)
  Bernadette Szőcs (third round)
  Sofia Polcanova (third round)
  Jeon Ji-hee (third round)
  Elizabeta Samara (third round)
  Miyu Kato (quarterfinals)
  Petrissa Solja (second round)
  Chen Szu-yu (fourth round)
  Zhang Mo (third round)
  Li Jie (second round)
  Suthasini Sawettabut (third round)
  Sun Yingsha (quarterfinals)
  Matilda Ekholm (second round)
  Adriana Díaz (third round)
  Georgina Póta (first round)
  Lee Ho Ching (third round)
  Li Qian (third round)
  Soo Wai Yam Minnie (fourth round)
  Britt Eerland (third round)
  Yue Wu (third round)
  Ni Xialian (first round)
  Dina Meshref (second round)
  Polina Mikhaylova (first round)
  Nina Mittelham (second round)
  Barbora Balážová (first round)
  Lin Ye (second round)
  Cheng Hsien-tzu (third round)
  Maria Xiao (first round)
  Margaryta Pesotska (second round)
  Manika Batra (second round)
  Ng Wing Nam (second round)
  Sabine Winter (first round)
  Hana Matelová (second round)
  Yana Noskova (second round)
  Szandra Pergel (second round)
  Ganna Gaponova (second round)
  Bruna Takahashi (second round)
  Amelie Solja (second round)
  Liu Jia (second round)
  Natalia Partyka (second round)
  Dóra Madarász (third round)
  Sarah de Nutte (second round)
  Lily Zhang (second round)
  Alex Galič (first round)
  Dana Čechová (second round)
  Lee Zion (second round)
  Galia Dvorak (first round)
  Choi Hyo-joo (second round)
  Cha Hyo-sim (fourth round)
  Linda Bergström (second round)
  Tetyana Sorochynska (second round)
  Stéphanie Loeuillette (first round)

Draw

Finals

Top half

Section 1

Section 2

Section 3

Section 4

Bottom half

Section 5

Section 6

Section 7

Section 8

References

External links
Draw

Women's singles